Úžice is a municipality and village in Mělník District in the Central Bohemian Region of the Czech Republic. It has about 900 inhabitants.

Administrative parts
Villages and hamlets of Červená Lhota, Kopeč and Netřeba are administrative parts of Úžice.

References

Villages in Mělník District